Sebastian Sponevik (born March 15, 2005) is an artistic gymnast on the Norwegian national team. He is a three-time Norwegian junior champion (2020-2022) and has represented Norway in the 2019 and 2022 Nordic Championships, as well as the 2022 European Olympic Youth Festival and European Championships, earning him a silver medal in the European vault final.

Junior career

2019
In 2019, the Norwegian Gymnastics Federation (NGTF) required gymnasts competing at national events on a junior level to turn 14 the year the event was held. Thus, Sponevik debuted as a junior at the first of three competitions in the Norwegian Cup that year. He came in third at the event, with a score of 70.250.

2020
Due to the COVID-19 pandemic, most competitions in the 2020 season were cancelled, including the first two events in the Norwegian Cup. Therefore, the only national appearances Sponevik made, were the 2020 junior Norwegian championship in Tromsø, and the third event in the Norwegian Cup. He won the All-Around competition at both events with 75.950 and 75.683 points respectively.

2021
Being plagued by injuries in his tibia and wrists, Sponevik was unable to compete at competitions in early 2021. After recovering from his injuries, Sponevik went on to win the 2021 Norwegian championship at Sotra with a score of 74.500.

2022
Sponevik competed at the 2022 junior Norwegian championship in Kabelvåg, during which he took home every possible gold medal; All-Around, apparatus finals, and the team competition.

He also competed at the 2022 International Junior Team Cup in Berlin, and the 2022 European Olympic Youth Festival under the guidance of national team coach Robert Hirsch. At the latter competition, Sponevik attained an eighth place in the All-Around competition, and a sixth place in the floor finals.

In August of 2022, Sponevik competed in the 2022 European Men's Artistic Gymnastics Championships in Munich, Germany. Whilst competing in the all-around competition, Sponevik qualified for the vault final, during which he won a silver medal with an average score of 14.316. He was the first Norwegian to do so since former gymnast Åge Storhaug's European silver medal in 1965.

Senior career
Though only 17 years old at the time, Sponevik competed as a senior at the 2022 Norwegian Championship in Elverum, making it his debut as a senior. At the event, which was held in June 2022, Sponevik secured a bronze for his All-Around performance, along with two gold, a silver, and a bronze in the apparatus finals.

References 

2005 births
Living people
Norwegian_male_artistic_gymnasts
People_from_Jessheim
People_from_Lørenskog